Torns IF is a Swedish football club located in Stångby, an urban area in Lund Municipality in Skåne County.

Background
Torns Idrottsförening was formed in 1965 and is based in Stångby, just north of the city of Lund. Torns IF is an expanding club with football as its primary focus. Currently around 350 children and youths play football for the club, and they are primarily from Stångby, Vallkärra, and the northern parts of the city of Lund.

Since 1983 the club has operated its own full-sized indoor hall and cafeteria, Tornhallen. The Stångby Fair is arranged by Torns IF every autumn with arts and crafts exhibitors in Tornhallen. For 30 years (1983-2012) Torns IF arranged the Torn indoor tournament for girls and boys from age 7 to seniors and veterans during weekends from October to February.

The club celebrated 50 years in 2015 and a book covering the history of the club was written.

Torns IF has participated mainly in the lower and middle divisions of the Swedish football league system. In the 2018 season the club plays in Division 1 Södra, which is at the third tier of Swedish football. The home matches are played at Tornvallen, Stångby in Lund.

Torns IF is affiliated to Skånes Fotbollförbund.

Season to Season

Current squad

Notable players

 Oskar Rönningberg
 Andreas Ekberg
 Astrit Selmani

Footnotes

External links
 Torns IF – Official website
 Torns IF Facebook

Football clubs in Skåne County
Association football clubs established in 1965
1965 establishments in Sweden
Football clubs in the Øresund Region